The term Diocese of Buenos Aires may refer to:

 Roman Catholic Diocese of Buenos Aires, former name (diocese created in 1620, elevated to Archdiocese in 1866)
 Greek Orthodox Archdiocese of Buenos Aires and South America, an archdiocese (metropolis) of the Ecumenical Patriarchate of Constantinople
 Antiochian Orthodox Diocese of Buenos Aires and Argentina, a diocese (eparchy) of the Greek Orthodox Patriarchate of Antioch
 Serbian Orthodox Diocese of Buenos Aires, an Eastern-Orthodox diocese of the Serbian Orthodox Church, created in 2011

See also
Buenos Aires
Catholic Church in Argentina
Serbian Orthodox Church in North and South America